Leopold Sivec (born 3 August 1958) is an Austrian ice hockey player. He competed in the men's tournament at the 1984 Winter Olympics.

References

1958 births
Living people
Austrian ice hockey players
Olympic ice hockey players of Austria
Ice hockey players at the 1984 Winter Olympics
Sportspeople from Villach